Christos Pantazis (born 9 October 1975) is a German politician for the SPD who was elected member of the Bundestag for Braunschweig in the 2021 German federal election.

Life and politics 

Pantazis was born 1975 in the West German city of Hanover to Greek parents. He studied medicine and became a doctor.

Pantazis joined the Social Democratic Party of Germany in 1998 and was directly elected to the Bundestag in 2021.

References 

Living people
1975 births
 People from Hanover
Social Democratic Party of Germany politicians
Members of the Bundestag 2021–2025
21st-century German politicians

German people of Greek descent
Members of the Bundestag for Lower Saxony
Members of the Landtag of Lower Saxony
German physicians